Ceratophyllus styx is a species of flea in the family Ceratophyllidae. It was described by Rothschild in 1900.

References 

Ceratophyllidae
Insects described in 1900